The 2022 Delaware Attorney General election took place on November 8, 2022, to elect the Attorney General of Delaware. Incumbent Democratic Attorney General Kathy Jennings won re-election to a second term. However, the race was closer than anticipated, with Murray's 46.17% being the Republicans' best result in this race since 2006.

Democratic primary

Candidates

Nominee
Kathy Jennings, incumbent attorney general

Republican primary

Candidates

Nominee
Julianne Murray, attorney and nominee for Governor of Delaware in 2020

Failed to file
Charles Welch, former Kent County judge

General election

Polling

Predictions

Results

See also
Delaware Attorney General

Notes

References

External links
Official campaign websites
Kathy Jennings (D) for Attorney General
Julianne Murray (R) for Attorney General
Charles Welch (R) for Attorney General

Attorney General
Delaware
Delaware Attorney General elections